Matriarchy is a social system in which women hold the primary power positions in roles of authority. In a broader sense it can also extend to moral authority, social privilege and control of property. 
While those definitions apply in general English, definitions specific to anthropology and feminism differ in some respects.

Matriarchies may also be confused with matrilineal, matrilocal, and matrifocal societies. While there are those who may consider any non-patriarchal system to be matriarchal, most academics exclude those systems from matriarchies as strictly defined.

Definitions, connotations, and etymology 
According to the Oxford English Dictionary (OED), matriarchy is a "form of social organization in which the mother or oldest female is the head of the family, and descent and relationship are reckoned through the female line; government or rule by a woman or women." A popular definition, according to James Peoples and Garrick Bailey, is "female dominance". Within the academic discipline of cultural anthropology, according to the OED, matriarchy is a "culture or community in which such a system prevails" or a "family, society, organization, etc., dominated by a woman or women" without reference to laws that require women to dominate. In general anthropology, according to William A. Haviland, matriarchy is "rule by women". A matriarchy is a society in which females, especially mothers, have the central roles of political leadership, moral authority, and control of property, but does not include a society that occasionally is led by a female for nonmatriarchal reasons or an occupation in which females generally predominate without reference to matriarchy, such as prostitution or women's auxiliaries of organizations run by men. According to Lawrence A. Kuzner in 1997, A. R. Radcliffe-Brown argued in 1924 that the definitions of matriarchy and patriarchy had "logical and empirical failings (...) [and] were too vague to be scientifically useful".

Most academics exclude egalitarian nonpatriarchal systems from matriarchies more strictly defined. According to Heide Göttner-Abendroth, a reluctance to accept the existence of matriarchies might be based on a specific culturally biased notion of how to define matriarchy: because in a patriarchy men rule over women, a matriarchy has frequently been conceptualized as women ruling over men, while she believed that matriarchies are egalitarian.

The word matriarchy, for a society politically led by females, especially mothers, who also control property, is often interpreted to mean the genderal opposite of patriarchy, but it is not an opposite. According to Peoples and Bailey, the view of anthropologist Peggy Reeves Sanday is that matriarchies are not a mirror or inverted form of patriarchies but rather that a matriarchy "emphasizes maternal meanings where 'maternal symbols are linked to social practices influencing the lives of both sexes and where women play a central role in these practices. Journalist Margot Adler wrote, "literally, ... ["matriarchy"] means government by mothers, or more broadly, government and power in the hands of women." Barbara Love and Elizabeth Shanklin wrote, "by 'matriarchy,' we mean a non-alienated society: a society in which women, those who produce the next generation, define motherhood, determine the conditions of motherhood, and determine the environment in which the next generation is reared." According to Cynthia Eller, "'matriarchy' can be thought of ... as a shorthand description for any society in which women's power is equal or superior to men's and in which the culture centers around values and life events described as 'feminine.'" Eller wrote that the idea of matriarchy mainly rests on two pillars, romanticism and modern social criticism. The notion of matriarchy was meant to describe something like a utopia placed in the past in order to legitimate contemporary social criticism. With respect to a prehistoric matriarchal Golden Age, according to Barbara Epstein, "matriarchy ... means a social system organized around matriliny and goddess worship in which women have positions of power." According to Adler, in the Marxist tradition, it usually refers to a pre-class society "where women and men share equally in production and power."

According to Adler, "a number of feminists note that few definitions of the word [matriarchy], despite its literal meaning, include any concept of power, and they suggest that centuries of oppression have made it impossible for women to conceive of themselves with such power."

Matriarchy has often been presented as negative, in contrast to patriarchy as natural and inevitable for society, and thus that matriarchy is hopeless. Love and Shanklin wrote:
When we hear the word "matriarchy", we are conditioned to a number of responses: that matriarchy refers to the past and that matriarchies have never existed; that matriarchy is a hopeless fantasy of female domination, of mothers dominating children, of women being cruel to men. Conditioning us negatively to matriarchy is, of course, in the interests of patriarchs. We are made to feel that patriarchy is natural; we are less likely to question it, and less likely to direct our energies to ending it.

The Matriarchal Studies school led by Göttner-Abendroth calls for an even more inclusive redefinition of the term: Göttner-Abendroth defines Modern Matriarchal Studies as the "investigation and presentation of non-patriarchal societies", effectively defining matriarchy as non-patriarchy. She has also defined matriarchy as characterized by the sharing of power equally between the two genders. According to Diane LeBow, "matriarchal societies are often described as ... egalitarian ...", although anthropologist Ruby Rohrlich has written of "the centrality of women in an egalitarian society."

Matriarchy is also the public formation in which the woman occupies the ruling position in a family. Some, including Daniel Moynihan, claimed that there is a matriarchy among Black families in the United States, because a quarter of them were headed by single women; thus, families composing a substantial minority of a substantial minority could be enough for the latter to constitute a matriarchy within a larger non-matriarchal society with non-matriarchal political dynamics.

Etymologically, it is from Latin māter (genitive mātris), "mother" and Greek ἄρχειν arkhein, "to rule". The notion of matriarchy was defined by Joseph-François Lafitau (1681–1746), who first named it ginécocratie. According to the OED, the earliest known attestation of the word matriarchy is in 1885. By contrast, gynæcocracy, meaning 'rule of women', has been in use since the 17th century, building on the Greek word  found in Aristotle and Plutarch.

Terms with similar etymology are also used in various social sciences and humanities to describe matriarchal or matriological aspects of social, cultural and political processes. Adjective matriological is derived from the noun matriology that comes from Latin word māter (mother) and Greek word λογος (logos, teaching about). The term matriology was used in theology and history of religion as a designation for the study of particular motherly aspects of various female deities. The term was subsequently borrowed by other social sciences and humanities and its meaning was widened in order to describe and define particular female-dominated and female-centered aspects of cultural and social life. The male alternative for matriology is patriology, with patriarchy being the male alternative to matriarchy.

Related concepts 
In their works, Johann Jakob Bachofen and Lewis Morgan used such terms and expressions as mother-right, female rule, gyneocracy, and female authority. All these terms meant the same: the rule by females (mother or wife). Although Bachofen and Lewis Morgan confined the "mother-right" inside households, it was the basis of female influence upon the whole society. The authors of the classics did not think that gyneocracy meant 'female government' in politics. They were aware of the fact that the sexual structure of government had no relation to domestic rule and to roles of both sexes.

Words beginning with gyn- 
A matriarchy is also sometimes called a gynarchy, a gynocracy, a gynecocracy, or a gynocentric society, although these terms do not definitionally emphasize motherhood. Cultural anthropologist Jules de Leeuwe argued that some societies were "mainly gynecocratic" (others being "mainly androcratic").

Gynecocracy, gynaecocracy, gynocracy, gyneocracy, and gynarchy generally mean 'government by women over women and men'. All of these words are synonyms in their most important definitions, and while these words all share that principal meaning, they differ a little in their additional meanings, so that gynecocracy also means 'women's social supremacy', gynaecocracy also means 'government by one woman', 'female dominance', and, derogatorily, 'petticoat government', and gynocracy also means 'women as the ruling class'. Gyneocracy is rarely used in modern times. None of these definitions are limited to mothers.

Some question whether a queen ruling without a king is sufficient to constitute female government, given the amount of participation of other men in most such governments. One view is that it is sufficient. "By the end of [Queen] Elizabeth's reign, gynecocracy was a fait accompli", according to historian Paula Louise Scalingi. Gynecocracy is defined by Scalingi as "government by women", similar to dictionary definitions (one dictionary adding 'women's social supremacy' to the governing role). Scalingi reported arguments for and against the validity of gynocracy and said, "the humanists treated the question of female rule as part of the larger controversy over sexual equality." Possibly, queenship, because of the power wielded by men in leadership and assisting a queen, leads to queen bee syndrome, contributing to the difficulty of other women in becoming heads of the government.

Some matriarchies have been described by historian Helen Diner as "a strong gynocracy" and "women monopolizing government" and she described matriarchal Amazons as "an extreme, feminist wing" of humanity and that North African women "ruled the country politically" before being overthrown by forms of patriarchy and, according to Adler, Diner "envision[ed] a dominance matriarchy".

Gynocentrism is the 'dominant or exclusive focus on women', is opposed to androcentrism, and "invert[s] ... the privilege of the ... [male/female] binary ...[,] [some feminists] arguing for 'the superiority of values embodied in traditionally female experience'".

Intergenerational relationships 
Some people who sought evidence for the existence of a matriarchy often mixed matriarchy with anthropological terms and concepts describing specific arrangements in the field of family relationships and the organization of family life, such as matrilineality and matrilocality. These terms refer to intergenerational relationships (as matriarchy may), but do not distinguish between males and females insofar as they apply to specific arrangements for sons as well as daughters from the perspective of their relatives on their mother's side. Accordingly, these concepts do not represent matriarchy as 'power of women over men' but instead familial dynamics.

Words beginning with matri- 

Anthropologists have begun to use the term matrifocality. There is some debate concerning the terminological delineation between matrifocality and matriarchy. Matrifocal societies are those in which women, especially mothers, occupy a central position. Anthropologist R. T. Smith refers to matrifocality as the kinship structure of a social system whereby the mothers assume structural prominence. The term does not necessarily imply domination by women or mothers. In addition, some authors depart from the premise of a mother-child dyad as the core of a human group where the grandmother was the central ancestor with her children and grandchildren clustered around her in an extended family.

The term matricentric means 'having a mother as head of the family or household'.

Matristic: Feminist scholars and archeologists such as Marija Gimbutas, Gerda Lerner, and Riane Eisler label their notion of a "woman-centered" society surrounding Mother Goddess worship during prehistory (in Paleolithic and Neolithic Europe) and in ancient civilizations by using the term matristic rather than matriarchal. Marija Gimbutas states that she uses "the term matristic simply to avoid the term matriarchy with the understanding that it incorporates matriliny."

Matrilineality, in which descent is traced through the female line, is sometimes conflated with historical matriarchy. Sanday favors redefining and reintroducing the word matriarchy, especially in reference to contemporary matrilineal societies such as the Minangkabau. The 19th-century belief that matriarchal societies existed was due to the transmission of "economic and social power ... through kinship lines" so that "in a matrilineal society all power would be channeled through women. Women may not have retained all power and authority in such societies ..., but they would have been in a position to control and dispense power... not unlike the nagging wife or the domineering mother."

A matrilocal society defines a society in which a couple resides close to the bride's family rather than the bridegroom's family.

History and distribution 
Most anthropologists hold that there are no known societies that are unambiguously matriarchal. According to J. M. Adovasio, Olga Soffer, and Jake Page, no true matriarchy is known to have actually existed. Anthropologist Joan Bamberger argued that the historical record contains no primary sources on any society in which women dominated. Anthropologist Donald Brown's list of human cultural universals (viz., features shared by nearly all current human societies) includes men being the "dominant element" in public political affairs, which he asserts is the contemporary opinion of mainstream anthropology. There are some disagreements and possible exceptions. A belief that women's rule preceded men's rule was, according to Haviland, "held by many nineteenth-century intellectuals". The hypothesis survived into the 20th century and was notably advanced in the context of feminism and especially second-wave feminism, but the hypothesis is mostly discredited today, most experts saying that it was never true.

Matriarchs, according to Peoples and Bailey, do exist; there are "individual matriarchs of families and kin groups."

By region and culture

Ancient Near East 
The Cambridge Ancient History (1975) stated that "the predominance of a supreme goddess is probably a reflection from the practice of matriarchy which at all times characterized Elamite civilization to a greater or lesser degree, before this practice was overthrown by the patriarchy".

Europe 
Tacitus claimed in his book Germania that in "the nations of the Sitones a woman is the ruling sex."

Cucuteni–Trypillia culture has been frequently discussed as a matriarchal society before its overthrow by the patriarchy, including its goddess art, connecting the moon, menstrual cycles, agricultural seasons, and life and death.

Anne Helene Gjelstad describes the women on the Estonian islands Kihnu and Manija as "the last matriarchal society in Europe" because "the older women here take care of almost everything on land as their husbands travel the seas".

Asia

Burma 
Possible matriarchies in Burma are, according to Jorgen Bisch, the Padaungs and, according to Andrew Marshall, the Kayaw.

China 

The Mosuo culture, which is in China near Tibet, is frequently described as matriarchal. The term matrilineal is sometimes used, and, while more accurate, still doesn't reflect the full complexity of their social organization. In fact, it is not easy to categorize Mosuo culture within traditional Western definitions. They have aspects of a matriarchal culture: women are often the head of the house, inheritance is through the female line, and women make business decisions. However, unlike in a true matriarchy, political power tends to be in the hands of males, indicating that some time ago, there was an overthrow by the patriarchy.

India 
In India, of communities recognized in the national Constitution as Scheduled Tribes, "some ... [are] matriarchal and matrilineal" "and thus have been known to be more egalitarian". According to interviewer Anuj Kumar, Manipur, India, "has a matriarchal society", but this may not be scholarly. In Kerala, Nairs, Thiyyas, Brahmins of Payyannoor village and Muslims of North Malabar and in Karnataka, Bunts and Billavas used to be matrilineal but are now patriarchal.

Indonesia 
Anthropologist Peggy Reeves Sanday said the Minangkabau society may be a matriarchy.

Vietnam 
According to William S. Turley, "the role of women in traditional Vietnamese culture was determined [partly] by ... indigenous customs bearing traces of matriarchy", affecting "different social classes" to "varying degrees". Peter C. Phan explains that "the ancient Vietnamese family system was most likely matriarchal, with women ruling over the clan or tribe" until the Vietnamese "adopt[ed] ... the patriarchal system introduced by the Chinese." That being said, even after adopting the patriarchal Chinese system, Vietnamese women, especially peasant women, still held a higher position than women in most patriarchal societies. According to Chiricosta, the legend of Âu Cơ is said to be evidence of "the presence of an original 'matriarchy' in North Vietnam and [it] led to the double kinship system, which developed there .... [and which] combined matrilineal and patrilineal patterns of family structure and assigned equal importance to both lines." Chiricosta said that other scholars relied on "this 'matriarchal' aspect of the myth to differentiate Vietnamese society from the pervasive spread of Chinese Confucian patriarchy," and that "resistance to China's colonization of Vietnam ... [combined with] the view that Vietnam was originally a matriarchy ... [led to viewing] women's struggles for liberation from (Chinese) patriarchy as a metaphor for the entire nation's struggle for Vietnamese independence," and therefore, a "metaphor for the struggle of the matriarchy to resist being overthrown by the patriarchy." According to Keith Weller Taylor, "the matriarchal flavor of the time is ... attested by the fact that Trung Trac's mother's tomb and spirit temple have survived, although nothing remains of her father", and the "society of the Trung sisters" was "strongly matrilineal". According to Donald M. Seekins, an indication of "the strength of matriarchal values" was that a woman, Trưng Trắc, with her younger sister Trưng Nhị, raised an army of "over 80,000 soldiers ... [in which] many of her officers were women", with which they defeated the Chinese. According to Seekins, "in [the year] 40, Trung Trac was proclaimed queen, and a capital was built for her" and modern Vietnam considers the Trung sisters to be heroines. According to Karen G. Turner, in the third century A.D., Lady Triệu  to personify the matriarchal culture that mitigated Confucianized patriarchal norms .... [although] she is also painted as something of a freak ... with her ... savage, violent streak."

Native Americans 

The Hopi (in what is now the Hopi Reservation in northeastern Arizona), according to Alice Schlegel, had as its "gender ideology ... one of female superiority, and it operated within a social actuality of sexual equality." According to LeBow (based on Schlegel's work), in the Hopi, "gender roles ... are egalitarian .... [and] [n]either sex is inferior." LeBow concluded that Hopi women "participate fully in ... political decision-making." According to Schlegel, "the Hopi no longer live as they are described here" and "the attitude of female superiority is fading". Schlegel said the Hopi "were and still are matrilineal" and "the household ... was matrilocal". Schlegel explains why there was female superiority as that the Hopi believed in "life as the highest good ... [with] the female principle ... activated in women and in Mother Earth ... as its source" and that the Hopi had no need for an army as they did not have rivalries with neighbors. Women were central to institutions of clan and household and predominated "within the economic and social systems (in contrast to male predominance within the political and ceremonial systems)." The Clan Mother, for example, was empowered to overturn land distribution by men if she felt it was unfair since there was no "countervailing ... strongly centralized, male-centered political structure".

The Iroquois Confederacy or League, combining five to six Native American Haudenosaunee nations or tribes before the U.S. became a nation, operated by The Great Binding Law of Peace, a constitution by which women participated in the League's political decision-making, including deciding whether to proceed to war, through what may have been a matriarchy or gyneocracy. According to Doug George-Kanentiio, in this society, mothers exercise central moral and political roles. The dates of this constitution's operation are unknown; the League was formed in approximately 1000–1450, but the constitution was oral until written in about 1880. The League still exists.

George-Kanentiio explains:
In our society, women are the center of all things. Nature, we believe, has given women the ability to create; therefore it is only natural that women be in positions of power to protect this function....We traced our clans through women; a child born into the world assumed the clan membership of its mother. Our young women were expected to be physically strong....The young women received formal instruction in traditional planting....Since the Iroquois were absolutely dependent upon the crops they grew, whoever controlled this vital activity wielded great power within our communities. It was our belief that since women were the givers of life they naturally regulated the feeding of our people....In all countries, real wealth stems from the control of land and its resources. Our Iroquois philosophers knew this as well as we knew natural law. To us it made sense for women to control the land since they were far more sensitive to the rhythms of the Mother Earth. We did not own the land but were custodians of it. Our women decided any and all issues involving territory, including where a community was to be built and how land was to be used....In our political system, we mandated full equality. Our leaders were selected by a caucus of women before the appointments were subject to popular review....Our traditional governments are composed of an equal number of men and women. The men are chiefs and the women clan-mothers....As leaders, the women closely monitor the actions of the men and retain the right to veto any law they deem inappropriate....Our women not only hold the reigns of political and economic power, they also have the right to determine all issues involving the taking of human life. Declarations of war had to be approved by the women, while treaties of peace were subject to their deliberations.

By chronology

Earliest prehistory and undated 
The controversy surrounding prehistoric or "primal" matriarchy began in reaction to the book by Bachofen, Mother Right: An Investigation of the Religious and Juridical Character of Matriarchy in the Ancient World, in 1861. Several generations of ethnologists were inspired by his pseudo-evolutionary theory of archaic matriarchy. Following him and Jane Ellen Harrison, several generations of scholars, usually arguing from known myths or oral traditions and examination of Neolithic female cult-figures, suggested that many ancient societies might have been matriarchal, or even that there existed a wide-ranging matriarchal society prior to the ancient cultures of which we are aware. According to Uwe Wesel, Bachofen's myth interpretations have proved to be untenable. The concept was further investigated by Lewis Morgan. Many researchers studied the phenomenon of matriarchy afterward, but the basis was laid by the classics of sociology. The notion of a "woman-centered" society was developed by Bachofen, whose three-volume Myth, Religion, and Mother Right (1861) impacted the way classicists such as Harrison, Arthur Evans, Walter Burkert, and James Mellaart looked at the evidence of matriarchal religion in pre-Hellenic societies. According to historian Susan Mann, as of 2000, "few scholars these days find ... [a "notion of a stage of primal matriarchy"] persuasive."

Kurt Derungs is a non-academic author advocating an "anthropology of landscape" based on allegedly matriarchal traces in toponymy and folklore.

Paleolithic and Neolithic Ages 
Friedrich Engels, in 1884, claimed that, in the earliest stages of human social development, there was group marriage and that therefore paternity was disputable, whereas maternity was not, so that a family could be traced only through the female line, and claimed that this was connected with the dominance of women over men or a Mutterrecht, which notion Engels took from Bachofen, who claimed, based on his interpretations of myths, that myths reflected a memory of a time when women dominated over men. Engels speculated that the domestication of animals increased wealth claimed by men. Engels said that men wanted control over women for use as laborers and because they wanted to pass on their wealth to their children, requiring monogamy. Engels did not explain how this could happen in a matriarchal society, but said that women's status declined until they became mere objects in the exchange trade between men and patriarchy was established, causing the global defeat of the female sex and the rise of individualism, competition, and dedication to achievement. According to Eller, Engels may have been influenced with respect to women's status by August Bebel, according to whom this matriarchy resulted in communism while patriarchy did not.

Austrian writer Bertha Diener, also known as Helen Diner, wrote Mothers and Amazons (1930), which was the first work to focus on women's cultural history. Hers is regarded as a classic of feminist matriarchal study. Her view is that in the past all human societies were matriarchal; then, at some point, most shifted to patriarchal and degenerated. The controversy was reinforced further by the publication of The White Goddess by Robert Graves (1948) and his later analysis of classical Greek mythology and the vestiges of earlier myths that had been rewritten after a profound change in the religion of Greek civilization that occurred within its very early historical times. From the 1950s, Marija Gimbutas developed a theory of an Old European culture in Neolithic Europe which had matriarchal traits, replaced by the patriarchal system of the Proto-Indo-Europeans with the spread of Indo-European languages beginning in the Bronze Age. According to Epstein, anthropologists in the 20th century said that "the goddess worship or matrilocality that evidently existed in many paleolithic societies was not necessarily associated with matriarchy in the sense of women's power over men. Many societies can be found that exhibit those qualities along with female subordination." From the 1970s, these ideas were taken up by popular writers of second-wave feminism and expanded with the speculations of Margaret Murray on witchcraft, by the Goddess movement, and in feminist Wicca, as well as in works by Eisler, Elizabeth Gould Davis, and Merlin Stone.

"A Golden Age of matriarchy" was, according to Epstein, prominently presented by Charlene Spretnak and "encouraged" by Stone and Eisler, but, at least for the Neolithic Age, has been denounced as feminist wishful thinking in The Inevitability of Patriarchy, Why Men Rule, Goddess Unmasked, and The Myth of Matriarchal Prehistory and is not emphasized in third-wave feminism. According to Eller, Gimbutas had a large part in constructing a myth of historical matriarchy by examining Eastern European cultures that she asserts, by and large, never really bore any resemblance in character to the alleged universal matriarchy suggested by Gimbutas and Graves. She asserts that in "actually documented primitive societies" of recent (historical) times, paternity is never ignored and that the sacred status of goddesses does not automatically increase female social status, and believes that this affirms that utopian matriarchy is simply an inversion of antifeminism.

J.F. del Giorgio insists on a matrifocal, matrilocal, matrilineal Paleolithic society.

Bronze Age 

According to Rohrlich, "many scholars are convinced that Crete was a matriarchy, ruled by a queen-priestess" and the "Cretan civilization" was "matriarchal" before "1500 BC," when it was overrun and colonized by the patriarchy.

Also according to Rohrlich, "in the early Sumerian city-states 'matriarchy seems to have left something more than a trace.

One common misconception among historians of the Bronze Age such as Stone and Eisler is the notion that the Semites were matriarchal while the Indo-Europeans practiced a patriarchal system. An example of this view is found in Stone's When God Was a Woman, wherein she makes the case that the worship of Yahweh was an Indo-European invention superimposed on an ancient matriarchal Semitic nation. Evidence from the Amorites and pre-Islamic Arabs, however, indicates that the primitive Semitic family was in fact patriarchal and patrilineal.

However, not all scholars agree. Anthropologist and Biblical scholar Raphael Patai writes in The Hebrew Goddess that the Jewish religion, far from being pure monotheism, contained from earliest times strong polytheistic elements, chief of which was the cult of Asherah, the mother goddess. A story in the Biblical Book of Judges places the worship of Asherah in the 12th century BC. Originally a Canaanite goddess, her worship was adopted by Hebrews who intermarried with Canaanites. She was worshipped in public and was represented by carved wooden poles. Numerous small nude female figurines of clay were found all over ancient Palestine and a seventh-century Hebrew text invokes her aid for a woman giving birth.

Shekinah is the name of the feminine holy spirit who embodies both divine radiance and compassion. Exemplifying various traits associated with mothers, she comforts the sick and dejected, accompanies the Jews whenever they are exiled, and intercedes with God to exercise mercy rather than to inflict retribution on sinners. While not a creation of the Hebrew Bible, Shekinah appears in a slightly later Aramaic translation of the Bible in the first or second century C.E., according to Patai. Initially portrayed as the presence of God, she later becomes distinct from God, taking on more physical attributes.

Meanwhile, the Indo-Europeans were known to have practiced multiple succession systems, and there is much better evidence of matrilineal customs among the Indo-European Celts and Germanics than among any ancient Semitic peoples.

Women were running Sparta while the men were often away fighting, or when both kings were incapacitated or too young to rule. Gorgo, Queen of Sparta, was asked by a woman in Attica something along the lines of, "You Spartan women are the only women that lord it over your men", to which Gorgo replied: "Yes, for we are the only women that are mothers of men!"

Iron Age to Middle Ages 
Arising in the period ranging from the Iron Age to the Middle Ages, several early northwestern European mythologies from the Irish (e.g., Macha and Scáthach), the Brittonic (e.g., Rhiannon), and the Germanic (e.g., Grendel's mother and Nerthus) contain ambiguous episodes of primal female power which have been interpreted as folk evidence of a real potential for matriarchal attitudes in pre-Christian European Iron Age societies. Often transcribed from a retrospective, patriarchal, Romanised, and Catholic perspective, they hint at an earlier, culturally disturbing, era when female power could have predominated. The first-century–attested historic British figure of Boudicca indicates that Brittonnic society permitted explicit female autocracy or a form of gender equality in a form which contrasted strongly with the patriarchal structure of Mediterranean civilisation that later overthrew it.

20th–21st centuries 
The Mosuo people are an ethnic group in southwest China. They are considered one of the most well-known matriarchal societies, although many scholars assert that they are rather matrilineal. , the sole heirs in the family are still daughters. Since 1990, when foreign tourism became permitted, tourists started visiting the Mosuo people. As pointed out by the Xinhau News Agency, "tourism has become so profitable that many Mosuo families in the area who have opened their homes have become wealthy." Although this revived their economy and lifted many out of poverty, it also altered the fabric of their society to have outsiders present who often look down on the Mosuo's cultural practices.  

In 1995, in Kenya, according to Emily Wax, Umoja, a village only for women from one tribe with about 36 residents, was established under a matriarch. It was founded on an empty piece of land by women who fled their homes after being raped by British soldiers. They formed a safe-haven in rural Samburu County in northern Kenya. Men of the same tribe established a village nearby from which to observe the women's village, the men's leader objecting to the matriarch's questioning the culture and men suing to close the women's village. As of 2019, 48 women, most of whom who have fled gender-based violence like female genital mutilation, assault, rape, and abusive marriages call Umoja home, living with their children in this all female-village. Many of these women faced stigma in their communities following these attacks and had no choice but to flee. Others sought to escape from the nearby Samburu community, which practices child marriage and female genital mutilation.  In the village, the women practice “collective economic cooperation.” The sons are obligated to move out when they turn eighteen. Not only has the Umoja village protected its members, the members have also done extensive work for gender equity in Kenya. The message of the village has spread outside of Kenya as member “Lolosoli’s passion for gender equity in Kenya has carried her to speak on social justice at the United Nations and to participate in an international women’s rights conference in South Africa.”

The Khasi people live in Northeast India in the state of Meghalaya. Although largely considered matrilineal, some women's studies scholars such as Roopleena Banerjee consider the Khasi to be matriarchal. Banerjee asserts that “to assess and account a matriarchal society through the parameters of the patriarchy would be wrong” and that “we should avoid looking at history only through the colonizer/colonized boundaries.” The Khasi people consist of many clans who trace their lineage through the matriarchs of the families. A Khasi husband typically moves into his wife's home, and both wife and husband participate equally in raising their children. A Khasi woman named Passah explains that "[The father] would come to his wife's home late at night... In the morning, he's back at his mother's home to work in the fields,” showing how a man's role consists of supporting his wife and family in Khasi society. Traditionally, the youngest daughter, called the Khadduh, receives and cares for ancestral property. As of 2021, the Khasi continue to practice many female-led customs, with wealth and property being passed down through the female side of the family.

Spokespersons for various indigenous peoples at the United Nations and elsewhere have highlighted the central role of women in their societies, referring to them as matriarchies, in danger of being overthrown by the patriarchy, or as matriarchal in character.

Mythology

Amazons 
A legendary matriarchy related by several writers was Amazon society. According to Phyllis Chesler, "in Amazon societies, women were ... mothers and their society's only political and religious leaders", as well as the only warriors and hunters; "queens were elected" and apparently "any woman could aspire to and achieve full human expression." Herodotus reported that the Sarmatians were descendants of Amazons and Scythians, and that their females observed their ancient maternal customs, "frequently hunting on horseback with their husbands; in war taking the field; and wearing the very same dress as the men". Moreover, said Herodotus, "no girl shall wed till she has killed a man in battle". Amazons came to play a role in Roman historiography. Julius Caesar spoke of the conquest of large parts of Asia by Semiramis and the Amazons. Although Strabo was sceptical about their historicity, the Amazons were taken as historical throughout late Antiquity. Several Church Fathers spoke of the Amazons as a real people. Medieval authors continued a tradition of locating the Amazons in the North, Adam of Bremen placing them at the Baltic Sea and Paulus Diaconus in the heart of Germania.

Greece 
Robert Graves suggested that a myth displaced earlier myths that had to change when a major cultural change brought patriarchy to replace a matriarchy. According to this myth, in Greek mythology, Zeus is said to have swallowed his pregnant lover, the titan goddess Metis, who was carrying their daughter, Athena. The mother and child created havoc inside Zeus. Either Hermes or Hephaestus split Zeus's head, allowing Athena, in full battle armor, to burst forth from his forehead. Athena was thus described as being "born" from Zeus. The outcome pleased Zeus as it didn't fulfill the prophecy of Themis which (according to Aeschylus) predicted that Zeus will one day bear a son that would overthrow him.

Celtic myth and society 

According to Adler, "there is plenty of evidence of ancient societies where women held greater power than in many societies today. For example, Jean Markale's studies of Celtic societies show that the power of women was reflected not only in myth and legend but in legal codes pertaining to marriage, divorce, property ownership, and the right to rule...although this was overthrown by the patriarchy."

Basque myth and society 
The hypothesis of Basque matriarchism or theory of Basque matriarchism is a theoretical proposal launched by Andrés Ortiz-Osés that maintains that the existence of a psychosocial structure centered or focused on the matriarchal-feminine archetype (mother / woman, which finds in the archetype of the great Basque mother Mari, her precipitate as a projection of Mother Earth / nature) that "permeates, coagulates and unites the traditional Basque social group in a way that is different from the patriarchal Indo-European peoples".

This mythical matriarchal conception corresponds to the conception of the Basques, clearly reflected in their mythology. The Earth is the mother of the Sun and the Moon, compared to Indo-European patriarchal conceptions, where the sun is reflected as a God, numen or male spirit. Prayers and greetings were dedicated to these two sisters at dawn and dusk, when they returned to the bosom of Mother Earth.

Franz-Karl Mayr, this philosopher argued that the archetypal background of Basque mythology had to be inscribed in the context of a Paleolithic dominated by the Great Mother, in which the cycle of Mari (goddess) and her metamorphoses offers all a typical symbolism of the matriarchal-naturalistic context. According to the archetype of the Great Mother, this is usually related to fertility cults, as in the case of Mari, who is the determinant of fertility-fecundity, the maker of rain or hail, that on whose telluric forces depend the crops, in space and time, life and death, luck (grace) and misfortune.

Colchis

South America 
Bamberger (1974) examines several matriarchal myths from South American cultures and concludes that portraying the women from this matriarchal period as immoral often serves to restrain contemporary women in these societies, providing reason for the overthrow by the patriarchy..

In feminist thought 

While matriarchy has mostly fallen out of use for the anthropological description of existing societies, it remains current as a concept in feminism.

In first-wave feminist discourse, either Elizabeth Cady Stanton or Margaret Fuller (it is unclear who was first) introduced the concept of matriarchy and the discourse was joined in by Matilda Joslyn Gage. Victoria Woodhull, in 1871, called for men to open the U.S. government to women or a new constitution and government would be formed in a year; and, on a basis of equality, she ran to be elected president in 1872. Charlotte Perkins Gilman, in 1911 and 1914, argued for "a woman-centered, or better mother-centered, world" and described "government by women". She argued that a government led by either sex must be assisted by the other, both genders being "useful ... and should in our governments be alike used", because men and women have different qualities.

Cultural feminism includes "matriarchal worship", according to Prof. James Penner.

In feminist literature, matriarchy and patriarchy are not conceived as simple mirrors of each other. While matriarchy sometimes means "the political rule of women", that meaning is often rejected, on the ground that matriarchy is not a mirroring of patriarchy. Patriarchy is held to be about power over others while matriarchy is held to be about power from within, Starhawk having written on that distinction and Adler having argued that matriarchal power is not possessive and not controlling, but is harmonious with nature, arguing that women are uniquely capable of using power without exploitative purposes.

For radical feminists, the importance of matriarchy is that "veneration for the female principle ... somewhat lightens an oppressive system."

Feminist utopias are a form of advocacy. According to Tineke Willemsen, "a feminist utopia would ... be the description of a place where at least women would like to live." Willemsen continues, among "type[s] of feminist utopias[,] ... [one] stem[s] from feminists who emphasize the differences between women and men. They tend to formulate their ideal world in terms of a society where women's positions are better than men's. There are various forms of matriarchy, or even a utopia that resembles the Greek myth of the Amazons.... [V]ery few modern utopias have been developed in which women are absolute autocrats."

A minority of feminists, generally radical, have argued that women should govern societies of women and men. In all of these advocacies, the governing women are not limited to mothers:
 In her book Scapegoat: The Jews, Israel, and Women’s Liberation, Andrea Dworkin stated that she wanted women to have their own country, "Womenland," which, comparable to Israel, would serve as a "place of potential refuge". In the Palestine Solidarity Review, Veronica A. Ouma reviewed the book and argued her view that while Dworkin "pays lip service to the egalitarian nature of ... [stateless] societies [without hierarchies], she envisions a state whereby women either impose gender equality or a state where females rule supreme above males."
 Starhawk, in The Fifth Sacred Thing (1993), fiction, wrote of "a utopia where women are leading societies but are doing so with the consent of men."
 Phyllis Chesler wrote in Women and Madness (2005 and 1972) that feminist women must "dominate public and social institutions". She also wrote that women fare better when controlling the means of production and that equality with men should not be supported, even if female domination is no more "just" than male domination. On the other hand, in 1985, she was "probably more of a feminist-anarchist ... more mistrustful of the organisation of power into large bureaucratic states [than she was in 1972]". Between Chesler's 1972 and 2005 editions, Dale Spender wrote that Chesler "takes [as] a ... stand [that] .... [e]quality is a spurious goal, and of no use to women: the only way women can protect themselves is if they dominate particular institutions and can use them to serve women's interests. Reproduction is a case in point." Spender wrote Chesler "remarks ... women will be superior".
 Monique Wittig authored, as fiction (not as fact), Les Guérillères, with her description of an asserted "female State". The work was described by Rohrlich as a "fictional counterpart" to "so-called Amazon societies". Scholarly interpretations of the fictional work include that women win a war against men, "reconcil[e]" with "those men of good will who come to join them", exercise feminist autonomy through polyandry, decide how to govern, and rule the men. The women confronting men are, according to Tucker Farley, diverse and thus stronger and more united and, continued Farley, permit a "few ... men, who are willing to accept a feminist society of primitive communism, ... to live." Another interpretation is that the author created an open structure' of freedom".
 Mary Daly wrote of hag-ocracy, "the place we ["women traveling into feminist time/space"] govern", and of reversing phallocratic rule in the 1990s (i.e., when published). She considered equal rights as tokenism that works against sisterhood, even as she supported abortion being legal and other reforms. She considered her book pro-female and anti-male.
Rasa von Werder has also long advocated for a return to matriarchy, a restoration of its status before its overthrow by patriarchy, along with associated author William Bond as well.

Some such advocacies are informed by work on the matriarchies of the past:
 According to Prof. Linda M.G. Zerilli, "an ancient matriarchy ... [was "in early second-wave feminism"] the lost object of women's freedom." Prof. Cynthia Eller found widespread acceptance of matriarchal myth during feminism's second wave. According to Kathryn Rountree, the belief in a prepatriarchal "Golden Age" of matriarchy may have been more specifically about a matrifocal society, although this was believed more in the 1970s than in the 1990s–2000s and was criticized within feminism and within archaeology, anthropology, and theological study as lacking a scholarly basis, and Prof. Harvey C. Mansfield wrote that "the evidence [is] ... of males ruling over all societies at almost all times". Eller said that, other than a few separatist radical lesbian feminists, spiritual feminists would generously include "a place for men ... in which they can be happy and productive, if not necessarily powerful and in control" and might have social power as well.
 Jill Johnston envisioned a "return to the former glory and wise equanimity of the matriarchies" in the future and "imagined lesbians as constituting an imaginary radical state, and invoked 'the return to the harmony of statehood and biology.... Her work inspired efforts at implementation by the Lesbian Organization of Toronto (LOOT) in 1976–1980 and in Los Angeles.
 Elizabeth Gould Davis believed that a "matriarchal counterrevolution [replacing "a[n old] patriarchal revolution"] ... is the only hope for the survival of the human race." She believed that "spiritual force", "mental and spiritual gifts", and "extrasensory perception" will be more important and therefore that "woman will ... predominate", and that it is "about ... ["woman" that] the next civilization will ... revolve", as in the kind of past that she believed existed. According to critic Prof. Ginette Castro, Elizabeth Gould Davis used the words matriarchy and gynocracy "interchangeably" and proposed a discourse "rooted in the purest female chauvinism" and seemed to support "a feminist counterattack stigmatizing the patriarchal present", "giv[ing] ... in to a revenge-seeking form of feminism", "build[ing] ... her case on the humiliation of men", and "asserti[ng] ... a specifically feminine nature ... [as] morally superior." Castro criticized Elizabeth Gould Davis' essentialism and assertion of superiority as "sexist" and "treason".
 One organization that was named The Feminists was interested in matriarchy and was one of the largest of the radical feminist women's liberation groups of the 1960s. Two members wanted "the restoration of female rule", but the organization's founder, Ti-Grace Atkinson, would have objected had she remained in the organization, because, according to a historian, "[she] had always doubted that women would wield power differently from men."

 Robin Morgan wrote of women fighting for and creating a "gynocratic world".
 Adler reported, "if feminists have diverse views on the matriarchies of the past, they also are of several minds on the goals for the future. A woman in the coven of Ursa Maior told me, 'right now I am pushing for women's power in any way I can, but I don't know whether my ultimate aim is a society where all human beings are equal, regardless of the bodies they were born into, or whether I would rather see a society where women had institutional authority.

Some fiction caricatured the current gender hierarchy by describing an inverted matriarchal alternative without necessarily advocating for it. According to Karin Schönpflug, "Gerd Brantenberg's Egalia's Daughters is a caricature of powered gender relations which have been completely reversed, with the female sex on the top and the male sex a degraded, oppressed group"; "gender inequality is expressed through power inversion" and "all gender roles are reversed and women rule over a class of intimidated, effeminate men" compelled into that submissive gender role. "Egalia is not a typical example of gender inequality in the sense that a vision of a desirable matriarchy is created; Egalia is more a caricature of male hegemony by twisting gender hierarchy but not really offering a 'better world.

On egalitarian matriarchy, Heide Göttner-Abendroth's International Academy for Modern Matriarchal Studies and Matriarchal Spirituality (HAGIA) organized conferences in Luxembourg in 2003 and Texas in 2005, with papers published. Göttner-Abendroth argued that "matriarchies are all egalitarian at least in terms of gender—they have no gender hierarchy .... [, that, f]or many matriarchal societies, the social order is completely egalitarian at both local and regional levels", that, "for our own path toward new egalitarian societies, we can gain ... insight from ... ["tested"] matriarchal patterns", and that "matriarchies are not abstract utopias, constructed according to philosophical concepts that could never be implemented."

According to Eller, "a deep distrust of men's ability to adhere to" future matriarchal requirements may invoke a need "to retain at least some degree of female hegemony to insure against a return to patriarchal control", "feminists ... [having] the understanding that female dominance is better for society—and better for men—than the present world order", as is equalitarianism. On the other hand, Eller continued, if men can be trusted to accept equality, probably most feminists seeking future matriarchy would accept an equalitarian model.

"Demographic[ally]", "feminist matriarchalists run the gamut" but primarily are "in white, well-educated, middle-class circles"; many of the adherents are "religiously inclined" while others are "quite secular".

Biology as a ground for holding either males or females superior over the other has been criticized as invalid, such as by Andrea Dworkin and by Robin Morgan. A claim that women have unique characteristics that prevent women's assimilation with men has been apparently rejected by Ti-Grace Atkinson. On the other hand, not all advocates based their arguments on biology or essentialism.

A criticism by Mansfield of choosing who governs according to gender or sex is that the best qualified people should be chosen, regardless of gender or sex. On the other hand, Mansfield considered merit insufficient for office, because a legal right granted by a sovereign (e.g., a king), was more important than merit.

Diversity within a proposed community can, according to Becki L. Ross, make it especially challenging to complete forming the community. However, some advocacy includes diversity, in the views of Dworkin and Farley.

Prof. Christine Stansell, a feminist, wrote that, for feminists to achieve state power, women must democratically cooperate with men. "Women must take their place with a new generation of brothers in a struggle for the world's fortunes. Herland, whether of virtuous matrons or daring sisters, is not an option... [T]he well-being and liberty of women cannot be separated from democracy's survival." (Herland was feminist utopian fiction by Charlotte Perkins Gilman in 1911, featuring a community entirely of women except for three men who seek it out, strong women in a matriarchal utopia expected to last for generations, demonstrated a marked era of peace and personal satisfaction, although Charlotte Perkins Gilman was herself a feminist advocate of society being gender-integrated and of women's freedom.)
 	
Other criticisms of matriarchy are that it could result in reverse sexism or discrimination against men, that it is opposed by most people including most feminists, or that many women do not want leadership positions. governing takes women away from family responsibilities, women are too likely to be unable to serve politically because of menstruation and pregnancy, public affairs are too sordid for women and would cost women their respect and femininity (apparently including fertility), superiority is not traditional, women lack the political capacity and authority men have, it is impractical because of a shortage of women with the ability to govern at that level of difficulty as well as the desire and ability to wage war, women are less aggressive, or less often so, than are men and politics is aggressive, women legislating would not serve men's interests or would serve only petty interests, it is contradicted by current science on genderal differences, it is unnatural, and, in the views of a playwright and a novelist, "women cannot govern on their own." On the other hand, another view is that "women have 'empire' over men" because of nature and "men ... are actually obeying" women.

Pursuing a future matriarchy would tend to risk sacrificing feminists' position in present social arrangements, and many feminists are not willing to take that chance, according to Eller. "Political feminists tend to regard discussions of what utopia would look like as a good way of setting themselves up for disappointment", according to Eller, and argue that immediate political issues must get the highest priority.

"Matriarchists", as typified by male-conceived comic book character Wonder Woman, were criticized by Kathie Sarachild, Carol Hanisch, and some others.

In religious thought

Exclusionary 
Some theologies and theocracies limit or forbid women from being in civil government or public leadership or forbid them from voting, effectively criticizing and forbidding matriarchy. Within none of the following religions is the respective view necessarily universally held:
The prohibition has been attributed to a hadith of Muhammad, the founder and last prophet of Islam. The hadith says, according to Roald, "a people which has a woman as leader will never prosper." The hadith's transmission, context, and meaning have been questioned, wrote Roald. According to Roald, the prohibition has also been attributed as an extension of a ban on women leading prayers "in mixed gatherings" (which has been challenged) and to a restriction on women traveling (an attribution also challenged). Possibly, Roald noted, the hadith applies only against being head of state and not other high office. One source, wrote Roald, would allow a woman to "occupy every position except that of khalīfa (the leader of all Muslims)." One exception to the head-of-state prohibition was accepted without a general acceptance of women in political leadership, Roald reported. Political activism at lower levels may be more acceptable to Islamist women than top leadership positions, said Roald. The Muslim Brotherhood has stated that women may not be president or head of state but may hold other public offices but, "as for judiciary office, .... [t]he majority of jurispudents ... have forbidden it completely." In a study of 82 Islamists in Europe, according to Roald, 80% said women could not be state leaders but 75% said women could hold other high positions. In 1994, the Muslim Brotherhood said that "social circumstances and traditions" may justify gradualism in the exercise of women's right to hold office (below head of state). Whether the Muslim Brothers still support that statement is unclear. As reported in 1953, Roald reported later, "Islamic organizations held a conference in the office of the Muslim Brothers .... [and] claim[ed] ... that it had been proven that political rights for women were contrary to religion". Some nations have specific bans. In Iran at times, according to Elaheh Rostami Povey, women have been forbidden to fill some political offices because of law or because of judgments made under the Islamic religion. As to Saudi Arabia, according to Asmaa Al-Mohamed, "Saudi women ... are ... not allowed to enter parliament as anything more than advisors; they cannot vote, much less serve as representatives". According to Steven Pinker, in a 2001–2007 Gallup poll of 35 nations having 90% of the world's Muslims, "substantial majorities of both sexes in all the major Muslim countries say that women should be allowed to vote without influence from men ... and to serve in the highest levels of government."
 In Rabbinical Judaism, among orthodox leaders, a position, beginning before Israel became a modern state, has been that for women to hold public office in Israel would threaten the state's existence, according to educator Tova Hartman, who reports the view has "wide consensus". When Israel ratified the international women's equality agreement known as CEDAW, according to Marsha Freeman, it reserved nonenforcement for any religious communities that forbid women from sitting on religious courts. According to Freeman, "the tribunals that adjudicate marital issues are by religious law and by custom entirely male." Men's superiority' is a fundamental tenet in Judaism", according to Irit Umanit. According to Freeman, Likud party-led "governments have been less than hospitable to women's high-level participation."
 In Buddhism, according to Karma Lekshe Tsomo, some hold that "the Buddha allegedly hesitated to admit women to the Saṅgha ...." because their inclusion would hasten the demise of the monastic community and the very teachings of Buddhism itself. "In certain Buddhist countries—Burma, Cambodia, Laos, Sri Lanka, and Thailand—women are categorically denied admission to the Saṅgha, Buddhism's most fundamental institution", according to Tsomo. Tsomo wrote, "throughout history, the support of the Saṅgha has been actively sought as a means of legitimation by those wishing to gain and maintain positions of political power in Buddhist countries."
 Among Hindus in India, the Rashtriya Swayamsevak Sangh, "India's most extensive all-male Hindu nationalist organization," has debated whether women can ever be Hindu nationalist political leaders but without coming to a conclusion, according to Paola Bacchetta. The Rashtriya Sevika Samiti, a counterpart organization composed of women, believes that women can be Hindu nationalist political leaders and has trained two in Parliament, but considers women only as exceptions, the norm for such leadership being men.

 In Protestant Christianity, considered only historically, in 1558, John Knox (Maria Stuart's subject) wrote The First Blast of the Trumpet against the Monstrous Regiment of Women. According to Scalingi, the work is "perhaps the best known analysis of gynecocracy" and Knox was "the most notorious" writer on the subject. According to an 1878 edition, Knox's objection to any women reigning and having "empire" over men was theological and it was against nature for women to bear rule, superiority, dominion, or empire above any realm, nation, or city. Susan M. Felch said that Knox's argument was partly grounded on a statement of the apostle Paul against women teaching or usurping authority over men. According to Maria Zina Gonçalves de Abreu, Knox argued that a woman being a national ruler was unnatural and that women were unfit and ineligible for the post. Kathryn M. Brammall said Knox "considered the rule of female monarchs to be anathema to good government" and that Knox "also attacked those who obeyed or supported female leaders", including men. Robert M. Healey said that Knox objected to women's rule even if men accepted it. On whether Knox personally endorsed what he wrote, according to Felch, Jasper Ridley, in 1968, argued that even Knox may not have personally believed his stated position but may have merely pandered to popular sentiment, itself a point disputed by W. Stanford Reid. On the popularity of Knox's views, Patricia-Ann Lee said Knox's "fierce attack on the legitimacy of female rule ... [was one in which] he said ... little that was unacceptable ... to most of his contemporaries", although Judith M. Richards disagreed on whether the acceptance was quite so widespread. According to David Laing's Preface to Knox's work, Knox's views were agreed with by some people at the time, the Preface saying, "[Knox's] views were in harmony with those of his colleagues ... [Goodman, Whittingham, and Gilby]". Writing in agreement with Knox was Christopher Goodman, who, according to Lee, "considered the woman ruler to be a monster in nature, and used ... scriptural argument to prove that females were barred ... from any political power", even if, according to Richards, the woman was "virtuous". Some views included conditionality; while John Calvin said, according to Healey, "that government by a woman was a deviation from the original and proper order of nature, and therefore among the punishments humanity incurred for original sin". Nonetheless, Calvin would not always question a woman's right to inherit rule of a realm or principality. Heinrich Bullinger, according to Healey, "held that rule by a woman was contrary to God's law but cautioned against [always] using that reason to oppose such rule". According to Richards, Bullinger said women were normally not to rule. Around 1560, Calvin, in disagreeing with Knox, argued that the existence of the few women who were exceptions showed that theological ground existed for their exceptionalism. Knox's view was much debated in Europe at the time, the issue considered complicated by laws such as on inheritance and since several women were already in office, including as Queens, according to de Abreu. Knox's view is not said to be widely held in modern Protestantism among leadership or laity.

Inclusionary 

According to Eller, feminist thealogy conceptualized humanity as beginning with "female-ruled or equalitarian societies", until displaced by patriarchies, and that in the millennial future gynocentric,' life-loving values" will return to prominence. This, according to Eller, produces "a virtually infinite number of years of female equality or superiority coming both at the beginning and end of historical time".

Among criticisms is that a future matriarchy, according to Eller, as a reflection of spirituality, is conceived as ahistorical, and thus may be unrealistic, unreachable, or even meaningless as a goal to secular feminists.

In popular culture

Ancient theatre
As criticism in 390 BC, Aristophanes wrote a play, Ecclesiazusae, about women gaining legislative power and governing Athens, Greece, on a limited principle of equality. In the play, according to Mansfield, Praxagora, a character, argues that women should rule because they are superior to men, not equal, and yet she declines to assert publicly her right to rule, although elected and although acting in office. The play, Mansfield wrote, also suggests that women would rule by not allowing politics, in order to prevent disappointment, and that affirmative action would be applied to heterosexual relationships. In the play, as Mansfield described it, written when Athens was a male-only democracy where women could not vote or rule, women were presented as unassertive and unrealistic, and thus not qualified to govern. The play, according to Sarah Ruden, was a fable on the theme that women should stay home.

Literature
Elizabeth Burgoyne Corbett's New Amazonia: A Foretaste of the Future is an early feminist utopian novel (published 1889), which is matriarchal in that all political leadership roles in New Amazonia are required to be held by women, according to Duangrudi Suksang.
Roquia Sakhawat Hussain's Sultana's Dream is an early feminist utopia (published 1905) based on advanced science and technology developed by women, set in a society, Ladyland, run by women, where "the power of males is taken away and given to females," and men are secluded and primarily attend to domestic duties, according to Seemin Hasan.
Marion Zimmer Bradley's book, The Ruins of Isis (1978), is, according to Batya Weinbaum, set within a "female supremacist world".
In Marion Zimmer Bradley's book, The Mists of Avalon (1983), Avalon is an island with a matriarchal culture, according to Ruben Valdes-Miyares.
In Orson Scott Card's Speaker for the Dead (1986) and its sequels, the alien pequenino species in every forest are matriarchal.
In Sheri S. Tepper's book, The Gate to Women's Country (1988), the only men who live in Women's Country are the "servitors," who are servants to the women, according to Peter Fitting.
Élisabeth Vonarburg's book, Chroniques du Pays des Mères (1992) (translated into English as In the Mothers' Land) is set in a matriarchal society where, due to a genetic mutation, women outnumber men by 70 to 1.
N. Lee Wood's book Master of None (2004) is set in a "closed matriarchal world where men have no legal rights", according to Publishers Weekly.
Wen Spencer's book A Brother's Price (2005) is set in a world where, according to Page Traynor, "women are in charge", "boys are rare and valued but not free", and "boys are kept at home to do the cooking and child caring until the time they marry".
Elizabeth Bear's Carnival (2006) introduces New Amazonia, a colony planet with a matriarchal and largely lesbian population who eschew the strict and ruthless population control and environmentalism instituted on Earth. The Amazonians are aggressive, warlike and subjugate the few men they tolerate for reproduction and service, but they are also pragmatic and defensive of their freedom from the male-dominated Coalition that seeks to conquer them.
In Naomi Alderman's book, The Power (2016), women develop the ability to release electrical jolts from their fingers, thus leading them to become the dominant gender.
Jean M. Auel's Earth's Children (1980–2011).
In the SCP Foundation, which is a collaborative online horror fiction website, the Daevites are an ancient society in which women took the roles of both religious and political leaders, and men often take the place of slaves

Film
In the 2011 Disney animated film Mars Needs Moms, Mars is ruled by a female Martian known only as The Supervisor, who long ago deemed all male martians to the trash underground and kept all females in functioning society. The film reveals The Supervisor, for an unexplained reason, changed how Martian society was being run (from children being raised by parents) to Martian children being raised by "Nannybots". The Supervisor sacrifices one Earth mother every twenty-five years for that mother's knowledge of order, discipline and control, which is transferred to the Nannybots who raise the female Martians.

Animals

Matriarchy may also refer to non-human animal species in which females hold higher status and hierarchical positions, such as among spotted hyenas, elephants, lemurs, naked mole rats, and bonobos. Such animal hierarchies have not been replaced by patriarchy. The social structure of European bison herds has also been described by specialists as a matriarchy – the cows of the group lead it as the entire herd follows them to grazing areas. Though heavier and larger than the females, the older and more powerful males of the European bison usually fulfill the role of satellites that hang around the edges of the herd. Apart from the mating season when they begin to compete with each other, European bison bulls serve a more active role in the herd only once a danger to the group's safety appears. In bonobos, even the highest ranking male will sometimes face aggression from females and is occasionally injured by them. Female bonobos secure feeding privileges and exude social confidence while the males generally cower on the sidelines. The only exceptions are males with influential mothers, so even the rank between the males is influenced strongly by females. Females also initiate group travels.

See also 

 Alain Daniélou
 Çatalhöyük (denials of matriarchy)
 Female cosmetic coalitions
 Marianismo
 Menstrual synchrony
 
 Bissagos Islands
 Trưng sisters

Notes

References

Bibliography

 
 
 
 
  – translated from Radioscopie du féminisme américain (Paris, France: Presses de la Fondation Nationale des Sciences Politiques, 1984)

Further reading 

 Czaplicka, Marie Antoinette, Aboriginal Siberia, a Study in Social Anthropology (Oxford: Clarendon Press, 1914)
 Finley, M.I., The World of Odysseus (London: Pelican Books, 1962)
 Gimbutas, Marija, The Language of the Goddess (1991)
 Goldberg, Steven, Why Men Rule: A Theory of Male Dominance (rev. ed. 1993)
 Hutton, Ronald, The Pagan Religions of the Ancient British Isles (1993)
 Lapatin, Kenneth, Mysteries of the Snake Goddess: Art, Desire, and the Forging of History (2002)
 Lerner, Gerda, The Creation of Feminist Consciousness: From the Middle Ages to Eighteen-Seventy (Oxford: Oxford University Press, 1993)
 Lerner, Gerda, The Creation of Patriarchy (Oxford: Oxford University Press, 1986)
 
 Sanday, Peggy Reeves, Women at the Center: Life in a Modern Matriarchy (Cornell University Press, 2002)
 Schiavoni, Giulio, Bachofen in-attuale? (chapter), in Il matriarcato. Ricerca sulla ginecocrazia del mondo antico nei suoi aspetti religiosi e giuridici (Turin, Italy: Giulio Einaudi editore, 2016) (Johann Jakob Bachofen, editor)
 Shorrocks, Bryan, The Biology of African Savannahs (Oxford University Press, 2007)
 Stearns, Peter N., Gender in World History (N.Y.: Routledge, 2000)

External links 

 Knight, Chris,  Early Human Kinship was Matrilineal (2008)

 
Family
Motherhood
Mother goddesses
Female
Feminist theory
Political anthropology